Alain Caron may refer to:

Alain Caron (ice hockey) (1938–1986), Canadian ice hockey player
Alain Caron (bassist) (born 1955), French Canadian jazz bassist